Nischelle Renee Turner is the co-host of Entertainment Tonight (2014–present) and Secret Celebrity Renovation (2021–present). Previously she was former entertainment correspondent for HLN's Showbiz Tonight and CNN and an entertainment correspondent for KNBC in Los Angeles. She was a general assignment reporter for KTTV Fox 11 from 2004 and to October 2, 2008, and worked as a sideline reporter for Fox's Sunday NFL broadcasts, and did segments for a show called Dailies. Prior to KTTV, she worked for WEHT, the ABC affiliate in Evansville, Indiana and for WVUE, the Fox affiliate in New Orleans. She is a native of Columbia, Missouri. She attended the University of Missouri, and graduated from its Missouri School of Journalism in 1998. She used to work with either analyst Kurt Warner or Torry Holt and either play-by-play Chris Myers, Sam Rosen, or Chris Rose. She also works with Paul Sunderland on college basketball telecasts.

It was announced that she would replace Rocsi Diaz as weekend co-anchor and correspondent on Entertainment Tonight in fall 2014. Nischelle is a seven-time Emmy-award winner for her work on Entertainment Tonight, winning her latest, the Daytime Emmy Award for Outstanding Entertainment News Program, in 2022.

References

External links
Nischelle Turner on Twitter

CNN people
College basketball announcers in the United States
Living people
National Football League announcers
People from Columbia, Missouri
Rock Bridge High School alumni
Television anchors from Columbia, Missouri
Television anchors from Evansville, Indiana
University of Missouri alumni
Year of birth missing (living people)